The USA Softball International Cup previously known as the World Cup of Softball, is an annual softball tournament.  The first eight World Cups were held at the ASA Hall of Fame Stadium in Oklahoma City, Oklahoma. The competition is governed by USA Softball, which is also headquartered in Oklahoma City. The name was changed in 2018 due to WBSC Event Name Regulations. 
In 2018 it was held at Bill Barber Park in Irvine, CA, and in 2019 at Olympic Stadium in Columbus, GA.

History
The World Cup is a round robin format consisting of a number of teams from around the world. Each team plays each other once, then the two teams with the best records play in a one-game, winner-take-all championship.  The number of teams has varied, with as few as 4 teams (in 2010) and as many as 14 teams (in 2016).

The official world competition was first held in 2005 and has been played every year since, with the exception of 2008 due to many national teams' participation in the Olympics.  However, softball has since been discontinued as an Olympic sport, thereby ensuring that the World Cup will remain relevant at the international level for the foreseeable future.

Results

Medal table

Participating nations

References

 
Cup
USA Softball
Recurring sporting events established in 2005
Annual sporting events in the United States
2005 establishments in Oklahoma
Softball